Synodontis thamalakanensis is a species of upside-down catfish native to Botswana and Namibia.  This species grows to a length of  SL.

References

External links 

thamalakanensis
Catfish of Africa
Fish of Botswana
Freshwater fish of Namibia
Fish described in 1935
Taxa named by Henry Weed Fowler